Korope was an ancient Greek town of Magnesia, located in the region of Thessaly, with a site sacred to Apollo. Its site is identified as near modern Margarania.

References

Sources

Populated places in ancient Thessaly
Former populated places in Greece
Ancient Magnesia